The 2002 La Plata tornado was an extremely powerful and fast moving multi-vortex F4 tornado that devastated the town of La Plata, Maryland, killing 3 people, and injuring some 122 others. As part of the Tornado outbreak of April 27–28, 2002, it caused $115 million in damage and is one of the strongest tornadoes to hit the greater Baltimore-Washington D.C. area. 

At approximately 6:56 pm (EST), the tornado touched down south of Marbury in western Charles County, Maryland. Just 6 minutes later, the tornado began its crossing over La Plata killing one. At 7:30 pm, two more people died as the twister entered Calvert County. It then moved out onto the Chesapeake Bay just north of the Calvert Cliffs Nuclear Power Plant. After crossing the bay, the tornado then continued across Dorchester County again intensifying to F3 before dissipating as it approached Salisbury, Maryland. The tornado had one of the faster accepted forward speeds, on record.

Meteorological synopsis 

During that afternoon, a tornado formed from a supercell that developed in central West Virginia and moved across the Appalachian Mountains. The thunderstorm first became tornadic near Quicksburg, VA. Several tornado warnings were issued for the Rockingham and Shenandoah counties, where an F2 tornado occurred. Later on, at 6:45 pm (EST), a severe thunderstorm warning was issued for northern Charles and Calvert Counties in which a call-to-action statement mentioned the possibility of tornadoes. Just 17 minutes later at 7:02 pm, 6 minutes after the tornado touched down, tornado warnings were issued for Charles and Calvert. During this time there was a problem with the EAS activation process, with over 53 percent of the radio stations broadcasting towards the La Plata listening area experiencing problems/outages. Around the same time, damage and eyewitness accounts indicate that a second tornado formed a quarter of a mile south of the primary tornado. Just within a few minutes, both tornadoes crossed the heart of La Plata between 7:02 pm and 7:07 pm, causing catastrophic damage. As the primary tornado continued moving east through the rest of Charles County, the secondary tornado dissipated, peaking at F2 intensity.

At approximately 7:30 pm, the tornado crossed into Calvert County, Maryland, causing widespread F1/F2 damage. As the twister tore through Calvert, it then moved onto its path over the Chesapeake Bay. Shortly after crossing the bay, the tornado made landfall in Dorchester County, intensifying and causing F3 damage before dissipating as it neared Salisbury, Maryland. 

In total, the twister lasted 90 minutes, scarring a 64-mile path across southeast Maryland; moving at an average speed of around 43 mph (69.2 km/h).

Impact 

The tornado took a path through Charles, Calvert, Dorchester and Wicomico Counties, downing or uprooting thousands of trees and leveling several structures, including catastrophic structural damage in downtown La Plata, where approximately 65 percent of the area was heavily damaged or destroyed. 3 people were killed, and some 122 others were injured. In all, the tornado inflicted $115 million in damage.

After touchdown, F1 damage was reported near Pisgah, where a house was unroofed with F3 damage reported in two subdivisions west of La Plata. Unfortunately, as the tornado moved southeastward, it continued to strengthen while tearing through downtown La Plata, with swaths of F4 being observed. Along Route 6, cars were tossed & thrown over, with the 125-foot city water tower also being blown over.  At the Posies Market, only a few walls were left standing. Heavy F4 damage was noted just east of the lumber yard. While moving through La Plata, the tornado was likely moving at the unusually fast speed of 58 mph (93.3 km/h), nearly a mile a minute, with destruction occurring in near seconds. After leaving La Plata, a heavily wooded area sustained severe damage, with several more homes being leveled. A 51-year-old man was killed with his wife being critically injured when their house, which was under construction, on Hawkins Gate Road collapsed. During the striking of one of the homes near Normandie and Route 6, seven people were inside and miraculously managed to survive. (3 were already in the basement while 2 others were on the first floor headed to the basement, with the last 2 still on the second floor.) In total across Charles County, 638 homes were damaged while 100 others were completely destroyed. 143 business (mainly in downtown La Plata) were damaged with 49 others being destroyed.  

At approximately 7:30 pm, the tornado moved into Calvert County south of the Patuxent River Bridge (Route 231) and struck the Patuxent View development in which over half of the homes were damaged. A home with no anchoring or foundation east of this area was picked up and thrown 80 feet into a culvert, unfortunately killing an elderly couple, whom were in the house at the time. The tornado damage in Calvert was rated F1 to F2 intensity; 125 homes were damaged, with another 10 being completely destroyed. Shortly thereafter, the twister crossed over into the Chesapeake Bay, just north of the Calvert Cliffs Nuclear Power Plant, with evidence of damage along the shoreline.    

After crossing the Chesapeake Bay, the main tornado pushed into Dorchester County just south of Taylor's Island. F3 damage was reported with one house and several outbuildings, being destroyed near Hip Roof Road. Debris from the twister such as cancelled checks, bank/tax documents, and teller receipts from La Plata was found in southern Delaware, well over 60 miles away.    

There were five total fatalities attributed to the tornado; three as a direct result of the storm and two from indirect effects. The tornado was initially rated F5 but was downgraded in a secondary damage survey. This preliminary F5 rating, partly due to damage to a brick building in downtown La Plata, was lowered to F4, after the damage assessment team determined some of the damage was likely due to flying debris from a lumber company nearby. Damage to houses, initially rated F5, were lowered when an engineering survey determined these homes were not properly anchored, causing them to be swept off their foundations by lesser winds. Due to the fast forward speed of this tornado, it had less time to dwell over structures & buildings, moving nearly a mile a minute (96.5 km/h), during its havoc in downtown La Plata; damage likely would have been more intense if the storm was slower. Although F4 tornadoes are already a rare event along the East Coast, what's even more odd with this storm was its forward speed & location well outside of the climatologically favored area of the country for violent tornadoes. This event is largely responsible for how twisters are surveyed today. This is not the deadliest tornado to strike La Plata. On November 9, 1926, another F4 tornado killed 13 school children and 4 townspeople, injuring some 35.

Aftermath 

In the wake of the tornado, Gov. Parris N. Glendening declared a state of emergency in Charles, Calvert and Dorchester counties with County schools and offices closing also. The Red Cross helped place several families in nearby hotels. Just two days later over 90% of the debris were cleared off the roads, opening traffic back up to the area. With media coverage of the deadly twister being nationwide, building damage surveys were being done by the Federal Emergency Management Agency's, Building Performance Assessment Team, and Wind Engineering Research Council during the same time the NWS was conducting their damage survey. After/due to this event, La Plata placed several tornado sirens all around and near the town for preparation on future storms.

See also 

 Tornado outbreak of June 2, 1998
 Tornado outbreak of September 24, 2001

External Links

 1926 La Plata Tornado

References 

Tornadoes in Maryland
Tornadoes of 2002